Brian Donald Young (born October 2, 1958) is a Canadian former professional ice hockey defenceman who played eight games in the National Hockey League with the Chicago Black Hawks during the 1980–81 season. Young was a fourth round selection by the Black Hawks in the 1978 NHL Amateur Draft. He spent the majority of his career with Schwenninger ERC of the German Bundesliga, where he played from 1981 to 1987.

Career statistics

Regular season and playoffs

International

Awards
 WCHL Second All-Star Team – 1978

External links
 

1958 births
Living people
Canadian ice hockey defencemen
Chicago Blackhawks draft picks
Chicago Blackhawks players
Dallas Black Hawks players
ECH Chur players
Estevan Bruins players
Ice hockey people from Alberta
Kölner Haie players
New Brunswick Hawks players
New Westminster Bruins players
People from Jasper, Alberta
Schwenningen ERC players